Robert Cecil Smith (December 15, 1912 – June 26, 2001) was an American actor of the stage, television, and film.

Career 
Smith appeared in stage plays and musicals throughout the United States. 

A Variety review for Gramercy Ghost said, "Robert Smith squeezes the maximum in laughs from his role of the strait-laced fiance who is continually in hot water from one source or another". Another Variety review for Gramercy Ghost noted that he had "helpful drive and conviction" and a Billboard review by Bob Francis noted, "Robert Smith does well as the stock-written money man who naturally loses out in the love sweepstakes".

He received positive attention for his role in The Girl in Pink Tights. Bob Francis of The Billboard noted that Smith was one of the production's "solid contributors". Variety noted, "Robert Smith plays the financial angel in good fashion".

Variety positively reviewed his performance in Auntie Mame.  

Smith and Gus Becker, a former Stork Club waiter, opened a restaurant called the Coat of Arms in New York in January 1958. A party for Rosalind Russell was held there when she left the stage production of Auntie Mame.

Broadway credits 

 Lost Horizons (1934)

 You Never Know (1938)
 One for the Money (1939) 
 Two for the Show (1940) 
 Gramercy Ghost (1951) 
 The Girl in Pink Tights (1954)  
 Auntie Mame as Beauregard Jackson Pickett Burnside

Partial filmography
 Baby Brother (1927) – Tunney
 The Apache Raider (1928) – 'Beaze' La Mare
 Sunny Side Up (1929) – Little Boy (uncredited)
 Hit the Saddle (1937) – Hank, McGowan's henchmen (uncredited)
 Parachute Battalion (1941) – Private
 Father Takes a Wife (1941) – George, Junior's Driver (uncredited)
 Man-I-Cured (1941) – Leon's Nephew
 The Gay Falcon (1941) – Policeman Outside Morgue (uncredited)
 Four Jacks and a Jill (1942) – Joe – Press Agent (uncredited)
 Call Out the Marines (1942) – Billy Harrison
 Obliging Young Lady (1942) – Charles 'Charlie' Baker
 Framing Father (1942) – Reporter
 The Falcon Takes Over (1942) – Police Officer (uncredited)
 The Mayor of 44th Street (1942) – Eddie, the House Manager (uncredited)
 Criminal Court (1946) – Officer Doyle – Homicide (uncredited)
 Motor Maniacs (1946)
 On the Town (1949) – Spectator (uncredited)

References

External links

1912 births
2001 deaths
American male film actors
American male musical theatre actors
American male television actors
20th-century American singers
20th-century American male actors
20th-century American male singers